Mad River may refer to:

Places

Canada
Mad River (British Columbia), a river of British Columbia
Mad River (Ontario), a river of Ontario

United States
Mad River (California)
Mad River, California, a community in Trinity County, California
Mad River (Connecticut), a river in New Haven County, Connecticut
Mad River (Cold River), a tributary of the Cold River in Maine
Mad River (Massachusetts), a river of Massachusetts
Mad River (Cocheco River), a tributary of the Cocheco River in New Hampshire
Mad River (Pemigewasset River), a tributary of the Pemigewasset River in New Hampshire
Mad River (Ohio)
Mad River Road, an overland route in Ohio
Mad River (Vermont)
Mad River Glen, a ski area in Vermont
Mad River (Washington)

Other uses
Mad River (band), a rock band based in San Francisco, California during the 1960s
Mad River (novel), a western novel by Donald Hamilton
Mad River Brewing Company, a brewing company in California

See also
 Erythropotamos, a river in Bulgaria and Greece known in Bulgarian as Luda reka ("Mad River")
 Mad River Township (disambiguation)